Émile Charles Marie Senart (26 March 1847 – 21 February 1928) was a French Indologist.

Besides numerous epigraphic works, we owe him several translations in French of Buddhist and Hindu texts, including several Upaniṣad.

He was Paul Pelliot's professor at the Collège de France.

He was elected a member of the Académie des inscriptions et belles-lettres in 1882, president of the Société asiatique from 1908 to 1928 and founder of the "Association française des amis de l'Orient" in 1920.

Selected works 
1875: Essai sur la légende du Bouddha - Paris.
 Les Inscriptions de Piyadasi - Paris
1881: Les Inscriptions de Piyadasi / 1 / Les quatorze édits.
1886: Les Inscriptions de Piyadasi / 2 / L.édits détachés. L'auteur et la langue des édits.    
1882–1897: Le Mahāvastu: Sanskrit text. Published for the first time and accompanied by introductions and commentary by E. Sénart. - Paris : Imprimerie Nationale, 1882–1897, Volume 1/ 1882, Volume 2/ 1890, Volume 3/ 1897
1889: Gustave Garrez
1896: Les Castes dans l'Inde, les faits et le système - Paris (Caste in India. Translated by E. Denison Ross. London 1930)
1901: Text of Inscriptions discovered at the Niya Site, 1901 / Transcr. and edited by A. M. Boyer, E. J. Rapson and E. Senart. Oxford : Clarendon Press, 1920 (Kharosthi Inscriptions discovered by Sir Aurel Stein in Chinese Turkestan ; 1)
1907: Origines Bouddhiques
1927: Text of Inscriptions discovered at the Niya, Endere, and Lou-lan Sites, 1906-7 / Auguste M. Boyer; Edward James Rapson; Émile Charles Marie Senart. - Oxford.
1930: Chāndogya Upaniṣad Translated and annotated by Émile Sénart, Société d'édition: Les Belles Lettres, Paris.

References

Sources 
 
 Finot, Louis (1928). Emile Senart, Bulletin de l'École française d'Extrême-Orient Année 28 (1), 335-347

External links 

 Émile Sénart on Wikisource
 SENART Émile, Charles, Marie on Académie des Inscriptions et Belles-Lettres

1847 births
1928 deaths
Writers from Reims
French scholars of Buddhism
French orientalists
French Indologists
French translators
Translators from Sanskrit
Members of the Académie des Inscriptions et Belles-Lettres
Members of the Société Asiatique
Members of the Royal Netherlands Academy of Arts and Sciences
Members of the Prussian Academy of Sciences
Corresponding members of the Saint Petersburg Academy of Sciences
Corresponding Members of the Russian Academy of Sciences (1917–1925)
Honorary Members of the Russian Academy of Sciences (1917–1925)
Honorary Members of the USSR Academy of Sciences
Corresponding Fellows of the British Academy